Ponera pennsylvanica is a species of ant that is usually found in mesic forests in the Eastern United States. The species' nests are usually found under rotting logs, in rotting stumps or logs, in acorns, in soil, and in leaf mold. Ant colonies usually have no more than 100 worker ants.

References

Ponerinae
Insects described in 1804